Nottingham Township may refer to:

 Nottingham Township, Wells County, Indiana
 Nottingham Township, New Jersey
 Nottingham Township, Harrison County, Ohio
 Nottingham Township, Pennsylvania
 East Nottingham Township, Pennsylvania
 West Nottingham Township, Pennsylvania

Township name disambiguation pages